Roman I (died March 1394) was Voivode of Moldavia from December 1391 to March 1394. He was the second son of Costea and Margareta Muşata (= "the beautiful" in Old Romanian) the daughter of the first ruler of Moldavia, Bogdan I and the founder Muşatin family.

During his reign, Moldova incorporated all the territories between the Carpathians and Dniester, Roman I becoming the first Moldavian ruler to call himself "voivode from the [Carpathian] mountains to the [ Black Sea ] shore" or "Prince of Moldavia, from the Carpathian Mountains to the Sea." The important fortress of Cetatea Albă also came under Moldavian rule during this period.

Like the previous Moldavian rulers, he paid homage to the Polish king Władysław II Jagiełło. However, in 1393 he supported Fyodor Koriatovych, the prince of Podolia, in the war against Władysław II  and Lithuanian grand duke Vytautas. After their defeat at Braclaw, Roman was forced to give up the throne in favour of his son Stephen I.

Roman I built the first church and fortifications in the town of Roman, considered to be named in his honour.

He was interred in Bogdana Monastery, the princely church of Rădăuţi.

His wife was Anastasia. According to some historians she could be sister of Mircea the Elder's mother. Others consider her the daughter of Lațcu of Moldavia - unlikely as Latcu's daughter would have been his first cousin.

See also

References

External links
Unibuc CLASSICA, University of Bucharest
The oldest Moldavian document, sealed by Roman I of Moldavia 

Rulers of Moldavia
House of Bogdan-Mușat
Burials at Bogdana Monastery
Roman, Romania
1394 deaths

Year of birth unknown